Paola Guzmán Carrasco (born 12 June 1998) is a Bolivian footballer who plays as a forward or a midfielder for Spanish Segunda Federación club Sporting Plaza de Argel and the Bolivia women's national team.

Club career
Guzmán has played for UD Universidad in Bolivia and for Joventut Almassora CF and Viajes InterRías FF in Spain.

International career
Guzmán made her senior debut for Bolivia on 21 February 2021 in a 0–3 friendly away loss to Ecuador.

References

1998 births
Living people
Bolivian women's footballers
Women's association football forwards
Women's association football midfielders
Bolivia women's international footballers
Bolivian expatriate footballers
Bolivian expatriate sportspeople in Spain
Expatriate women's footballers in Spain